Unnai Vaazhthi Paadukiren is a 1992 Indian Tamil-language romance film directed by Shridev. The film stars Parthiban, Suman Ranganathan and Mohini. It was released on 7 February 1992.

Plot 
Ravi, a poor mechanic who works in the garage of and lives with his mother. He is very close to the owner so much that he sees him as his son. He is deeply in love with Priya, a rich girl. Priya hates him and flashback reveals that Ravi and Priya are married and had marital breakdown because he lied to her that his mother is dead and that he lied about his financial status. 

Priya stays with her parents who resent that she is staying with them instead of taking responsibility of her love marriage. In the meantime, Asha, another rich girl, falls in love with Ravi and she proposes to him. Ravi tells her that he is, in fact, Priya's husband and is working to convince Priya to live with him. The rest of the story is what happens to Ravi, Priya and Asha.

Cast 

Parthiban as Ravi
Suman Ranganathan as Priya
Mohini as Asha
V. K. Ramasamy
Nassar as Asha's father
J. V. Ramana Murthy as Priya's father
Manorama as Ravi's mother
Sangeeta as Priya's mother
Senthil
Kumarimuthu
MRK
Typist Gopu
Vasu
Prabhu Deva (special appearance)

Soundtrack 
The soundtrack was composed by Ilaiyaraaja, with lyrics written by Vaali, Gangai Amaran, Na. Kamarasan, Muthulingam, Piraisoodan  and Mu. Metha. The song "Oh Oh Oh Kaalai" uses the anupallavi of the Hindi song "Khoya Khoya Chand Khula Aasman" from Kala Bazar (1960).

Reception 
S. Chidambaram of The Indian Express wrote, "Debutant director Shridev, who has also penned the story, screenplay and dialogue, is able to keep your interest intact till the interval through a suspense [..] So you feel bored when the second part drags on" and called Ilayaraja's music "redeeming feature of this movie".

References

External links 

1990s romance films
1990s Tamil-language films
1992 directorial debut films
1992 films
Films scored by Ilaiyaraaja
Films set in Bangalore
Films shot in Bangalore
Indian romance films